During the 1995–96 Spanish football season, Valencia CF competed in La Liga and the Copa del Rey.

Summary
During summer the club appointed Luis Aragonés as its new manager. In the 1995–96 La Liga Valencia were involved in a title race for the first time since the late 1970s.

After a series of impressive performances, stretching from January to March the club reached the second place of the table with a 4–1 victory over Cruijff' FC Barcelona. During April their  league form faltered, and the title challenge looked over. However the club managed to re-establish itself back at the top in May. An emphatic 2–3 defeat of Atlético de Madrid at Vicente Calderón Stadium in April was the team's signature performance.

The club's fanbase and the entire province paid tribute to the squad regardless of their failure to win the trophy.

Squad
Squad at end of season

Transfers

In
 Patxi Ferreira from Atlético Madrid Sietes from  Real Oviedo   Xabier Eskurza from FC Barcelona José Ignacio Sáenz from Logroñés  Iñaki Hurtado from Real Valladolid Viola from Corinthians

Out
FW Luboslav Penev to Atlético Madrid
GK Molina to Atlético Madrid
FW Oleg Salenko to Glasgow Rangers
Fernando Giner to Sporting Gijón
Robert to Villarreal
Álvaro Cervera to Racing Santander
Juan Carlos to Real Valladolid
Eloy to Sporting Gijón
Maqueda to Albacete Balompié
Raúl Ibañez to Real Valladolid
 Quique Medina to Deportivo Alavés

Source: BDFutbol.com

Competitions

La Liga

League table

Position by round

Matches

Source: Competitive Matches

Goal scorers
 Mijatović – 28
 Gálvez – 11
 Viola – 11
 Fernando – 10

Copa del Rey

2nd Round

3rd Round

Round of 16

Quarterfinals

Semifinals

Statistics

Players statistics

See also
Valencia CF
1995–96 La Liga
1995–96 Copa del Rey

References
 La Liga Primera División 95–96 RSSSF.com

Valencia CF seasons
Valencia